The 2014 Nordic Futsal Cup was held from December 4 to 7, 2014 in Finland. Finland won the tournament.

Standings

Matches

Goalscorers 
3 goals

  Stian Sortevik
  Panu Autio

2 goals

  Jukka Kytölä
  Morten Ravlo

1 goal

  Juhana Jyrkiäinen
  Antti Teittinen
  Miika Hosio
  Kevin Jørgensen
  Jim Bothmann Jensen
  Cristopher Moen
  Magnar Nordtun
  Mounir El-masrouri
  Patrik Burda
  Admir Ćatović
  Mathias Etèus
  Nikola Ladan
  Johan Roxström

Own goals
  Tomi Lahtinen (vs. Denmark)
  Abdurahim Lajaab (vs. Sweden)

Awards 

 Most Valuable Player

 Top Scorer
  Stian Sortevik (3 goals)
  Panu Autio (3 goals)
 Fair-Play Award

References

External links 
Nordic Futsal Cup results
Futsal Planet

Nordic Futsal Cup
2014
2014–15 in European futsal
2014–15 in Danish football
2014 in Norwegian football
2014 in Swedish football
2014 in Finnish football
Hyvinkää
Sports competitions in Tampere